Greenwood, West Virginia may refer to:
Greenwood, Boone County, West Virginia, an unincorporated community
Greenwood, Doddridge County, West Virginia, an unincorporated community
Greenwood, Fayette County, West Virginia, a ghost town
Greenwood, Morgan County, West Virginia, an unincorporated community